Berber orthography is the writing system(s) used to transcribe the Berber languages. In antiquity, the Libyco-Berber script was utilized to write Berber languages. Early uses of the script have been found on rock art and in various sepulchres. Usage of this script, in the form of Tifinagh, has continued into the present day among the Tuareg people. Following the spread of Islam, some Berber scholars also utilized the Arabic script. The Berber Latin alphabet was developed following the introduction of the Latin script in the nineteenth century by the West. The nineteenth century also saw the development of Neo-Tifinagh, an adaptation of Tuareg Tifinagh for use with other Berber languages.

There are now three writing systems in use for Berber languages: Tifinagh, the Arabic script, and the Berber Latin alphabet. Different groups in North Africa have different preferences of writing system, often motivated by ideology and politics.

Tifinagh

Neo-Tifinagh, a resurrected version of an alphabetic script found in historical engravings, is the de jure writing system for Tamazight in Morocco. The script was made official by a Dahir of King Mohammed VI, based on the recommendation of IRCAM. It was recognized in the Unicode standard in June 2004.

Tifinagh was chosen to be official after consideration of its univocity (one sound per symbol, allowing regional variation), economy, consistency, and historicity. Significantly, Tifinagh avoids negative cultural connotations of the Latin and Arabic scripts.

Tifinagh is preferred by young people as a symbol of identity and has popular support. It is especially popular for symbolic use, with many books and websites written in a different script featuring logos or title pages using Neo-Tifinagh. However, virtually no books or websites were being published in this alphabet, with activists primarily favoring Latin scripts for serious usage.

Tifinagh has been criticized for not being practical to implement, and for being Kabyle-centric and not historically authentic.  Following the Tifinagh Dahir road signs were installed in the Riffian city of Nador in Arabic and Tifinagh, but these were removed by security forces in the middle of the night soon after.

The Moroccan state arrested and imprisoned people using this script during the 1980s and the 1990s, but now Morocco is the only country in which Tifinagh has official status.

Latin

The Latin script has its origins in French colonialism. French missionaries and linguists found the Arabic script inconvenient, so they adapted the Latin alphabet to various Berber languages and Arabic vernaculars. While the established body of literature in the Arabic script was a barrier to wider adoption of the Latin script, it caught on among the French-educated minority, particularly in Algeria. Since independence, the Latin alphabet has been largely favored by the intelligentsia, especially in Kabylie where the Berberists are largely pro-Westernization and French-educated. A standard transcription for the Kabyle language was established in 1970, and most other Northern Berber dialects have to varying extents published literature in the Latin alphabet.

The Latin alphabet has been preferred among Amazigh linguists and researchers, and also has a great deal of established writing, including newspapers, periodicals, and magazines. It is more popular in Algeria than Morocco, but prevalent in the Riffian area. It is backed by the Amazigh elite, but is vehemently opposed by the Moroccan pro-Arab establishment. The Latin script is far more ensconced in the Kabyle dialect than in Tamazight.

The orthography used in most modern printed works is the Institut national des langues et civilisations orientales (INALCO) standard, designed for phonemicity. Older systems from the colonial French era are still found in place names and personal names.

Arabic

The Tifinagh script is the traditional script for written Berber; but Latin remains the predominant orthography for Berber literature for the general public in North Africa. Some Tamazight newspapers, periodicals, and magazines are written in Arabic script, although the Latin alphabet is preferred. Some North-African states policies have imposed Arabic script over other scripts suggested by Berber groups, this has been perceived as Arab colonialism replacing former French colonialism. Amazigh activists, however, eschew Arabic script which is generally unpopular among Berbers who believe it is symptomatic of North African governments' pan-Arabist views.

Medieval orthography
A consistent orthography was used in the few Berber texts in existence from the eleventh to the fourteenth century CE. These were written in an older Berber language likely to be most closely related to Tashelhiyt. The consonant g was written with jīm or kāf, ẓ with ṣād or sometimes zāy, and ḍ with ṭāʼ. Word-final wāw was usually accompanied by alif al-wiqāyah. The vowels signs fatḥah or kasrah represent a phonemic shwa /ə/ which was lost in the post-medieval language, e.g. tuwərmin  “joints, articulation”. Labialization may be represented by ḍammah, e.g. tagʷərsa  “ploughshare”. Prepositions, possessive complements and the like are mostly written as separate words. The medieval texts display many archaisms in phonology, morphology and lexicon.

Traditional Tashelhiyt orthography
The way in which Tashelhiyt has been written in the Arabic script during the past centuries is very consistent, to the extent that it is possible to talk about “a conventionalized orthography”. This premodern orthography has remained virtually unchanged since at least the end of the 16th century, and is still used today in circles of traditional Islamic scholars (ṭṭlba).

The Maghrebi script style is always used. Distinctive features of Maghrebi script are: the different pointing of fāʼ and qāf; shaddah may be represented with a V-shaped symbol; waṣl is indicated by writing the final vowel of the preceding word a second time with the alif (with u represented by a bar through the middle of the alif), e.g. kullu n-nāsi  “all the people”.

In premodern Shilha orthography, two extra letters were added to the alphabet to represent consonants not represented by the Standard Arabic alphabet: a kāf with three dots  for g, and ṣād with three dots  for ẓ (dots may also be added underneath the letter). Consonants ṛ and ḷ, which bear a minimal functional load, are not distinguished in the spelling from r and l.

Texts are always fully vocalized, with a, i and u written with the vowel signs fatḥah, kasrah, and ḍammah. Consonants without a following phonemic vowel are always written with a sukūn. Gemination is indicated as usual with shaddah, but in Shilha spelling it may be combined with sukūn to represent a geminated consonant without following vowel (which never occurs in Standard Arabic). Labialization is generally not represented, e.g. tagʷrsa  “plough share”. The Arabic waṣl spellings are often “mirrored” and used to write word-initial vowels, e.g. ayyur ula tafukt  “the moon as well as the sun”.

Vowel length is not distinctive in Shilha, but orthographically long vowels may be used to indicate emphasized syllables in metric texts, e.g. lxálayiq  “creatures” vs. standard Arabic orthography .

Final /-a/ in both native Berber words and loan words is sometimes written with alif maqṣūrah, even if the Standard Arabic spelling does not use it, e.g. zzka “alms tax” written as  vs. standard . Final -u or -w in Shilha words may be written with a following alif al-wiqāyah.

With respect to word divisions, the premodern orthography may be characterized as conjunctive (in contrast to most European orthographies, which are disjunctive). Thus, elements such as prepositions, preverbals, pronominal affixes, demonstrative and directional particles are written connected to a noun or verb form, e.g.  = ur anɣ iḍhir mani ɣ ur ikfis iblis-i “it is not apparent to us where Iblis has not sown [his depravity]”.

Notes

References

Bibliography 
 

 
 
 

 
 

Orthographies by language
Berber languages